The Louis Vuitton Trophy Dubai was the fourth in a scheduled series of regattas that compete for the Louis Vuitton Trophy. The regatta occurred in Dubai between 14–27 November 2010.  The Louis Vuitton Trophy format uses existing International America's Cup Class yachts loaned to the regatta by various America's Cup racing syndicates, keeping costs relatively low for the competing teams. 

The Louis Vuitton Trophy was organised after the success of the Louis Vuitton Pacific Series and the continued legal battle surrounding the America's Cup yachting competition at the time.  Because of the long delays from the legal action, and the fact that the 2010 America's Cup became a Deed of Gift match without a defender or challenger selection series, the Louis Vuitton Trophy series was established as a competition for other America's Cup racing syndicates.

The Dubai event was hosted by Dubai International Marine Club and sponsored by Emirates airlines.

The Yachts

The event used four International America's Cup Class yachts loaned specifically for the event. For Dubai, the boats were supplied by Team New Zealand (NZL-84 & NZL-92) and BMW Oracle Racing (USA-87 & USA-98).

Teams
Six teams participated in the Dubai event, down from the eight teams that appeared in the earlier Nice Côte d’Azur and Auckland Louis Vuitton Trophy regattas, and the ten teams that competed in La Maddalena.

The Races

Round Robin 1
14-18 November
Each team sailed each other team twice. One point was awarded for a win.

* = Point(s) deducted by umpires, A = Abandoned, P = Postponed, R = Retired

Round Robin 2
21-23 November
Each team sailed each other team once. Two points were awarded for a win.

* = Point(s) deducted by umpires, A = Abandoned, P = Postponed, R = Retired

Finals
26-27 November
Two best of three semi finals will be followed by a best of five final. The winner of the round robins will pick there semi final opponent from the top four teams.

Fleet Races
25 November
Up to three fleet races will be held, with each team sailing in up to two races. These will be a separate event from the match racing Trophy.

Sea Dubai Watersports Festival
The event will mark the start of the Sea Dubai Watersports Festival under the patronage of Mohammed bin Rashid Al Maktoum. This festival also includes the Dubai Shamaal World Surf Ski Championship, the Oakley Riot World Wakeboard Tournament, the UAE National Day Watersports Parade, the Mina Mile Swimming Competition, an Open Water Swim and Jet Ski Competition, the Traditional 43 ft Dhow Sailing Championship and finishes on 11 December with the final round of the Powerboat World Championships.

References

External links
 cupinfo
 www.louisvuittontrophy.com/ Official Website

        
        
        
        
        

Louis Vuitton regattas
International America's Cup Class
2010 in sailing
Sailing competitions in the United Arab Emirates
2010 in Emirati sport